Kirkmuirhill is a village in South Lanarkshire, Scotland. It borders Blackwood, near Lanark and is sited near Junction 9 of the M74 motorway. Its postal sector is ML11 9.

History
In 1810 John Begg, husband of Robert Burns youngest sister Isabella, became the land steward for Mr James Hope Vere MP on his estate at Blackwood. On 24 April 1813, after nearly three years at Blackwood, John met his death when his horse reared and fell on him, crushing him to death. He was returning from his regular trip to Lesmahagow market on a horse that he had been asked to ride because it had become fractious due to lack of exercise. Isabella was left a widow with nine children with ages from three to eighteen. For a while Mr James Hope Vere paid her a small annual grant however to make ends meet she opened a dame's school in Kirkmuirhill which she ran for four years before moving to Ormiston.

Education
There is a single primary school Bent Primary on the outskirts of the village, but a large proportion of pupils also attend Blackwood Primary School in the neighbouring village of Blackwood. There is also the denominational St. John's Primary there, which is a Roman Catholic primary school which has Kirkmuirhill within its catchment. When children reach secondary education, they normally attend high school in Lesmahagow, or Holy Cross Hamilton in the case of Catholic pupils from St. John's.
Traditional industry in the village was mining, but this has long since declined.

References
Notes

Bibliography
 Begg, Robert Burns (1891). Memoir of Isobel Burns. Privately printed. 

Villages in South Lanarkshire
Mining communities in Scotland